Dopatrium is a genus of flowering plants belonging to the family Plantaginaceae.

Its native range is Tropical and Southern Africa to Southwestern Pacific.

Species:

Dopatrium acutifolium 
Dopatrium angolense 
Dopatrium baoulense 
Dopatrium caespitosum 
Dopatrium dortmanna 
Dopatrium junceum 
Dopatrium lobelioides 
Dopatrium longidens 
Dopatrium macranthum 
Dopatrium nudicaule 
Dopatrium pusillum 
Dopatrium senegalense 
Dopatrium stachytarphetoides 
Dopatrium tenerum

References

Plantaginaceae
Plantaginaceae genera